Tumelo Khutlang (born 23 October 1995) is a Mosotho professional footballer who currently plays as a forward for Black Leopards in the South African Premier Division.

At the youth international level he played in the 2013 COSAFA U-20 Cup and 2015 African U-20 Championship qualifiers.

International career

International goals
Scores and results list Lesotho's goal tally first.

References

External links 
 
 
 

Living people
1995 births
Association football forwards
Lesotho footballers
Lesotho international footballers
Lesotho under-20 international footballers
Lioli FC players
Black Leopards F.C. players
South African Premier Division players
Lesotho expatriate footballers
Lesotho expatriate sportspeople in South Africa
Expatriate soccer players in South Africa
People from Teyateyaneng